Dennis Leroy Johnson (born October 22, 1951) was an American football defensive lineman in the National Football League for the Washington Redskins and Buffalo Bills.  He played college football at the University of Delaware and was drafted in the thirteenth round of the 1973 NFL Draft.

Johnson played high school football at Passaic High School.

The Delaware Sports Museum and Hall of Fame inducted Johnson in 2006.

References

External links
 Delaware Museum and Sports Hall of Fame 2006 Inductees
 Dennis Johnson, Irv Wisniewski Inducted into Delaware Museum and Sports Hall of Fame

1951 births
1997 deaths
Passaic High School alumni
Sportspeople from Passaic, New Jersey
American football defensive tackles
Washington Redskins players
Buffalo Bills players
Delaware Fightin' Blue Hens football players
Toronto Argonauts players